Horace Ashenfelter III (January 23, 1923 – January 6, 2018) was an American athlete. He competed in international athletics from 1947 to 1956. During his career he won fifteen national AAU titles and three collegiate national titles.

Biography
Ashenfelter was born in Collegeville, Pennsylvania, where he attended Collegeville High School. He completed his degree at Penn State, where he was a member of Delta Upsilon fraternity, and served in the United States Army Air Forces as a pilot and gunnery instructor during World War II.

Although he was considered a long shot, Ashenfelter was the surprise winner of the steeplechase at the 1952 Summer Olympics at Helsinki with a dramatic surge on the last lap following the final water jump after trailing substantially early in the race. In what was considered an early athletic Cold war battle, he finished ahead of Vladimir Kazantsev of the USSR and John Disley of Great Britain, and broke Kazantsev's unofficial world record (the IAAF did not accept official records in the steeplechase until 1954) in the process. Since Ashenfelter worked for the Federal Bureau of Investigation, it led to humorous comments about him being the first American spy who allowed himself to be chased by a Russian. In addition, Ashenfelter won the Sullivan Award as outstanding amateur athlete for the year 1952.

Ashenfelter won the Millrose Games two-mile run from 1952 to 1955 and again in 1957. His best winning time was in 1954 at 8:53.3.  He won the USA Cross Country Championships back-to-back in 1954–1955, three years after his Olympian younger brother Bill Ashenfelter had won the same championship, the only set of brothers to both win the event.

He was inducted into the National Track and Field Hall of Fame in 1975, the Millrose Games Hall of Fame in 2001 as a five-time champion and the National Distance Running Hall of Fame in 2012. He was inducted into the Sports Hall of Fame of New Jersey in 1998.

Personal life
Ashenfelter lived in Glen Ridge, New Jersey, where the Ashenfelter 8k Classic is held annually in his honor. The indoor track facility at his alma mater, Penn State, is named in his honor.

Ashenfelter died at a nursing home in West Orange, New Jersey, on January 6, 2018, 17 days before his 95th birthday.

See also
List of Pennsylvania State University Olympians

References

 Wallechinsky, David and Jamie Loucky (2008). "Track & Field (Men): 3000-Meter Steeplechase". In The Complete Book of the Olympics – 2008 Edition. London: Aurum Press Limited. pp. 169–70.

External links

 Running Past profile
 

1923 births
2018 deaths
Track and field athletes from Pennsylvania
People from Collegeville, Pennsylvania
Military personnel from Pennsylvania
People from Glen Ridge, New Jersey
Sportspeople from Montgomery County, Pennsylvania
American male middle-distance runners
American male steeplechase runners
Olympic gold medalists for the United States in track and field
Athletes (track and field) at the 1952 Summer Olympics
Athletes (track and field) at the 1956 Summer Olympics
Medalists at the 1952 Summer Olympics
Pan American Games track and field athletes for the United States
Pan American Games silver medalists for the United States
Pan American Games medalists in athletics (track and field)
Athletes (track and field) at the 1955 Pan American Games
James E. Sullivan Award recipients
Penn State Nittany Lions men's track and field athletes
Federal Bureau of Investigation agents
United States Army Air Forces pilots of World War II
Medalists at the 1955 Pan American Games
Military personnel from New Jersey